John DeBrito (December 3, 1968 – March 25, 2020) was a soccer player who played as a defender and midfielder. He was an All American at Southern Connecticut State University, spent at least one season playing indoor soccer, then played eight seasons outdoor, including six seasons in Major League Soccer. Born in Portuguese Cape Verde, he earned six caps with the United States national team from 1991 to 1992.

Youth and college
DeBrito was born in Cape Verde, but attended the W.F. Kaynor Technical High School of Waterbury, Connecticut.  He finished his high school soccer career as one of the highest-scoring players in state history.  Following high school, DeBrito attended Division II Southern Connecticut State University where he played on the men's soccer team from 1987 to 1990.  In 1988, he was named a second-team All-Star.  The next year, he led the Owls to the Division II championship, scoring both Southern Conn goals in the victory.  In 1990, he was a first-team All-Star.  In his four years with the Owls, DeBrito scored twenty goals and dished out thirty-two assists.

Professional
In 1991, the Tulsa Ambush of the National Professional Soccer League (NPSL) drafted DeBrito.  He spent the 1991–1992 NPSL season with the Ambush before the team folded at the end of the season.  In 1992, he joined Gremio Lusitano.  In 1994, DeBrito signed with the Boston Storm of the USISL.  In 1995, he moved to the New York Fever of the A League.  In February 1996, the New England Revolution picked DeBrito in the eleventh round (105th overall) of the MLS Inaugural Draft.  He played in twenty-one games in the 1996 season, which he played as a defender.  The Revolution waived DeBrito on March 17, 1997, and was quickly claimed by the MetroStars.  He played eight games with the MetroStars before moving to the Kansas City Wizards for the remainder of the 1997 and the 1998 season.  In 1999, the Columbus Crew selected DeBrito in the second round of the Supplemental Draft.  DeBrito remained with the Crew through the 1999 and 2000 season before being traded to the Dallas Burn during the 2001 season.  DeBrito played for the Burn in the U.S. Open Cup, but never saw time in any league games before being released by Dallas on July 1, 2001.  DeBrito finished out the 2001 season with the Connecticut Wolves of USISL.

National team
DeBrito earned six caps with the U.S. national team.  His first game came as a substitute to Marcelo Balboa in a 1-0 loss to Bermuda on February 21, 1991.  He was not called into the national team again until February 12, 1992, this time starting alongside Balboa in a scoreless tie with Costa Rica.  Over the next eight months, he appeared in a handful of games, most as substitutes until his last cap on October 9, 1992.  In 1993 DeBrito played with the U.S. at the World University Games.

In 2006, the Connecticut Soccer Hall of Fame inducted DeBrito.

Personal life
DeBrito's parents were John and Angelina DeBrito. He had five sisters: Vera, Fernanda, Valeriana, Angela, and Maria. His older brother, Pedro DeBrito, was also a professional soccer player in the 1980s and 1990s. DeBrito died in 2020.

References

External links
 New England Revolution fan profile
 MetroStars fan profile

1968 births
2020 deaths
American soccer players
Boston Storm players
Cape Verdean emigrants to the United States
Columbus Crew players
Connecticut Wolves players
FC Dallas players
Gremio Lusitano players
Sporting Kansas City players
Major League Soccer players
New York Red Bulls players
Nashville Metros players
National Professional Soccer League (1984–2001) players
New England Revolution players
New York Fever players
Southern Connecticut Fighting Owls men's soccer players
Tulsa Ambush players
United States men's international soccer players
USISL players
1992 King Fahd Cup players
MLS Pro-40 players
A-League (1995–2004) players
Columbus Crew draft picks
Association football defenders 
Association football midfielders